S-mode #1 is the first single compilation album by Masami Okui, released on 21 March 2001. It is J-pop genre.

Information
Disc-1 includes all songs from her singles that were released in August 1993 (1st single) until November 1995 (8th single) under King Records label.
Disc-2 includes 7 self-cover of songs she made for other artists and a bonus track.
This album was released together with her 28th single

Track listing

Disc 1

OVA Fantasia theme song
Lyrics: Satomi Arimori
Composition, arrangement: Toshiyuki Watanabe

Anime television series Tanoshii Willow Town opening song
 Lyrics: Miho Matsuba
 Composition, arrangement: Osamu Tezuka

 Anime television series Tanoshii Willow Town ending song
 Lyrics: Miho Matsuba
 Composition, arrangement: Osamu Tezuka
 I Was Born to Fall In Love
 OVA Compiler opening song
 Lyrics: Satomi Arimori
 Composition, arrangement: Hideya Nakazaki
 Full Up Mind
 OVA Compiler ending song
 Lyrics: Satomi Arimori
 Composition, arrangement: Hideya Nakazaki
 Reincarnation
 OVA Tekkaman Blade II opening song
 Lyrics: Satomi Arimori
 Composition: Takashi Kudo
 Arrangement: Toshiro Yabuki

 OVA Tekkaman Blade II image song
 Lyrics: Satomi Arimori
 Composition: Takashi Kudo
 Arrangement: Masami Okui
 My Jolly Days
 Anime film Ghost Sweeper Mikami ending song
 Lyrics: Keiko Kimoto
 Composition: Tsutomu Ohira
 Arrangement: Vink
 Beats the Band
 Anime film Ghost Sweeper Mikami soundtrack
 Lyrics: Mamie D. Lee
 Composition: Makoto Ikenaga
 Arrangement: Vink
 
 OVA Tekkaman Blade II ending song
 Lyrics: Satomi Arimori
 Composition: Takashi Kudo
 Arrangement: Toshiro Yabuki

 OVA Tekkaman Blade II ending song
 Lyrics: Satomi Arimori
 Composition: Takashi Kudo
 Arrangement: Toshiro Yabuki
 Get along
 With Megumi Hayashibara
 Anime television series Slayers opening song
 Lyrics: Satomi Arimori
 Composition: Hidetoshi Sato
 Arrangement: Tsutomu Ohira
 Kujikenaikara!
 With Megumi Hayashibara
 Anime television series Slayers ending song
 Lyrics: Satomi Arimori
 Composition: Masami Okui
 Arrangement: Toshiro Yabuki
 Mask
 Anime television series Sorcerer Hunters ending song
 Lyrics, composition: Masami Okui
 Arrangement: Toshiro Yabuki, Tsutomu Ohira
 Love is Fire
 Lyrics: Masami Okui
 Composition: Tsutomu Ohira
 Arrangement: Toshiro Yabuki, Tsutomu Ohira

Disc 2

 Lyrics, composition: Masami Okui
 Arrangement: Toshiro Yabuki

 Lyrics: Masami Okui
 Composition, arrangement: Tsutomu Ohira
But But But
 Lyrics, composition: Masami Okui
 Arrangement: Tsutomu Ohira
1 2 3
 Lyrics: Masami Okui
 Composition, arrangement: Hideki Sato

 Lyrics: Satomi Arimori
 Composition: Masami Okui
 Arrangement: System-B

 Lyrics, composition: Masami Okui
 Arrangement: Tsutomu Ohira
Someday
 Lyrics: Masami Okui
 Composition, arrangement: Hideki Sato

Original song
 Lyrics, composition: Masami Okui
 Arrangement: System-B

Sources
Official website: Makusonia

2001 compilation albums
Masami Okui albums